Jouko Sihveri Törmänen (10 April 1954 – 3 January 2015) was a Finnish ski jumper.

Career
His best-known success was at the 1980 Winter Olympics in Lake Placid, New York, where he won a gold medal in the individual large hill event.

World Cup

Standings

Wins

References

External links
 
 

1954 births
2015 deaths
People from Rovaniemi
Ski jumpers at the 1976 Winter Olympics
Ski jumpers at the 1980 Winter Olympics
Finnish male ski jumpers
Olympic medalists in ski jumping
Medalists at the 1980 Winter Olympics
Olympic gold medalists for Finland
Sportspeople from Lapland (Finland)
20th-century Finnish people